Microsoft Office 4.2 for Macintosh is a version of Microsoft Office for the classic Mac OS.

The applications in Microsoft Office 4.2 were:
Microsoft PowerPoint 4.0
Microsoft Word 6.0
Microsoft Excel 4.0
Mail 3.2

System requirements 
 A Mac OS-compatible computer equipped with a 68020 or higher processor or a PowerPC processor. 
 System 7 operating system or later. 
 At least 8 MB of physical RAM. 
 Sufficient hard disk space, depending on installation: min. 18 MB to max. 35 MB.
 An 8-bit color or 4-bit grayscale display with at least 640 × 400 resolution.

References

Office 4.2 for Macintosh
Macintosh-only software
1994 software